The 1962 Ohio Bobcats football team was an American football team that represented Ohio University in the Mid-American Conference (MAC) during the 1962 NCAA University Division football season. In their fifth season under head coach Bill Hess, the Bobcats compiled an 8–3 record (5–1 against MAC opponents), finished in second place in the MAC, lost to West Texas State in the 1962 Sun Bowl (14–15), and outscored all opponents by a combined total of 261 to 112.  They played their home games in Peden Stadium in Athens, Ohio.

The team's statistical leaders included Jim Albert with 375 rushing yards, Bob Babbitt with 1,010 passing yards, and Ron Curtis with 286 receiving yards.

Schedule

References

Ohio
Ohio Bobcats football seasons
Ohio Bobcats football